Lake Winnipegosis Salt Flats Ecological Reserve is an ecological reserve located on the west of Lake Winnipegosis, Manitoba, Canada. It was established in 1992 under the Manitoba Ecological Reserves Act.

See also
 List of ecological reserves in Manitoba
 List of protected areas of Manitoba

References

External links
 Lake Winnipegosis Salt Flats Ecological Reserve, Backgrounder
 iNaturalist: Lake Winnipegosis Salt Flats Ecological Reserve

Protected areas established in 1992
Ecological reserves of Manitoba
Nature reserves in Manitoba
Protected areas of Manitoba